

Anglophile Awards

Audie Awards 
The Audie Awards are annually presented by the American Audio Publishers Association for audiobooks and spoken-word entertainment.

Audio and Radio Industry Awards 
The Audio and Radio Industry Awards are annually presented by the Radio Academy to award excellence in UK radio and audio presenting and production.

BAFTA 
In 2006 Doctor Who was nominated for the British Academy Television Awards (BAFTA), shortlisted in the "Drama Series" category. Doctor Who was also nominated in several other categories in the BAFTA Craft Awards, including Writer (Russell T Davies), Director (Joe Ahearne), and Break-through Talent (production designer Edward Thomas). However, it did not win any of its categories at the Craft Awards.

On 22 April 2006, the programme won five categories (out of 14 nominations) at the lower-profile BAFTA Cymru awards, given to programmes made in Wales. It won Best Drama Series, Drama Director (James Hawes), Costume, Make-up and Photography Direction. Russell T Davies also won the Siân Phillips Award for Outstanding Contribution to Network Television.  At the BAFTA Cymru awards the following year the programme won eight of the 13 categories in which it was nominated, including Best Actor for David Tennant and Best Drama Director for Graeme Harper.

On 7 May 2006, the winners of the British Academy Television Awards were announced, and Doctor Who won both of the categories it was nominated for, the Best Drama Series and audience-voted Pioneer Award. Russell T Davies also won the Dennis Potter Award for Outstanding Writing for Television. Writer Steven Moffat won the Writer category at the 2008 BAFTA Craft Awards for his 2007 Doctor Who episode "Blink".

The series also won awards at the BAFTA Cymru ceremony on 27 April 2008, including "Best Screenwriter" for Steven Moffat, "Best Director: Drama" for James Strong, "Best Director Of Photography: Drama" for Ernie Vincze, "Best Sound" for the BBC Cymru Wales Sound Team and "Best Make-Up" for Barbara Southcott and Neill Gorton (of Millennium FX).

In March 2009, it was announced that Doctor Who had again been nominated in the "Drama Series" category for the British Academy Television Awards; however, it lost to the BBC series Wallander at the Awards on Sunday 26 April. The series picked up two BAFTAs at the British Academy Television Craft Awards on Sunday 17 May. Visual Effects company The Mill won the "Visual Effects" award for the episode "The Fires of Pompeii" and Philip Kloss won in the "Editing Fiction/Entertainment" category.

In 2011 Matt Smith was nominated for best television actor at the 2011 Bafta Television Awards, but eventually lost out to Daniel Rigby from Eric and Ernie. It was the first time an actor portraying the Doctor had received such a nomination.

In 2012 the production team was nominated for the BAFTA Craft Awards Visual Effects category.

BAFTA Cymru Awards

BAFTA Scotland Awards

BAFTA TV Awards

BBC

Auntie Awards 

In 1996, BBC television held the "Auntie Awards" as the culmination of their "TV60" series, celebrating 60 years of BBC television broadcasting, where Doctor Who was voted as the "Best Popular Drama" the corporation had ever produced, ahead of such ratings heavyweights as EastEnders and Casualty. All people involved into the last years of the series were rewarded, including actors Peter Davison (Fifth Doctor) and Sylvester McCoy (Seventh Doctor), who became the first actors to win an award for their role as the Doctor.

BBC Audio Drama Awards 
The BBC Audio Drama Awards is an awards ceremony created by BBC Radio to recognise excellence in the radio industry, in particular in audio dramas. The first awards were presented in 2012 and the ceremony has been located at BBC Radio's home Radio Theatre, Broadcasting House. Two Doctor Who audio dramas produced by Big Finish Productions have won the Best Audio Drama Award, in 2014 and 2017 respectively.

BBC's "Drama Best Of" 
Doctor Who was extremely popular at the BBC.co.uk's online "Best of Drama" poll and swept all the categories (except "Worst Drama") in both 2005 and 2006, the last two years it was made.

In 2005 it beat 29 other nominations with more than 50% of votes in every category, except Best Villain, especially winning Best Drama with 55.86% (ahead of the second-ranked series Bleak House with 15.95%). It also reached the second place in three categories it was nominated twice (Best Actor, Favourite Moment and Most Desirable Star, with the four highest ranks for the last one).
 In 2005 Christopher Eccleston obtained 59.42% of votes as the Ninth Doctor and David Tennant was ranked second with 9.15% as the Tenth Doctor.

In almost every category of the BBC's list there were 30 nominations. However, only the five best ranked are finally presented (the others figure on a list). The Doctor Who nominees presented here are the ones which was on top 5 (which does not include, for example, John Barrowman's 2005 nomination for Best Actor due to his 14th place).

BBC Radio 1 Teen Awards 
Doctor Who was nominated at the 2010 BBC Radio 1 Teen Awards for 'Best TV Show'. It lost out to Channel 4's The Inbetweeners. However, the show went on to win at the 2013 awards. It was also nominated at the 2017 awards.

TV Moments Awards 
BBC Awarded to a scene of the episode "The Doctor Dances" the TV Moments Award for Top Moment of May/June 2005. Finally, the moment was nominated as all the others "Top Moment" winners of the year for the Golden Moment Award, which he also won.

British Fantasy Awards 
In 2009, Doctor Who won the inaugural Best Television Award at the British Fantasy Awards. It won the award again the following year.

Broadcast Awards 
Doctor Who is currently nominated at Broadcast Awards (presented by the eponymous magazine) in the Best International Programme Sales category, along its spin-off Torchwood.

Broadcasting Press Guild Awards 
The Broadcasting Press Guilt Awards are presented by the Broadcasting Press Guild, a British association of journalists. Doctor Who have been nominated for seven awards overall, but did not win any.

Constellation Awards 
The Constellation Awards are Science Fiction specialised awards. Doctor Who won three awards in 2007, three in 2008, three in 2009, one in 2010 and one in 2011. David Tennant has been nominated for Best Actor five times, with three wins. In 2010 Murray Gold won Best Technical Accomplishment in Science Fiction Film or Television Series, especially beating Academy Award for Best Visual Effects winner Inception (nominated in the same category as him for its Visual Effects).

Critics Choice Super Awards 
The Critics Choice Super Awards honors superheroes, science fiction/fantasy, horror, action and animation movies and series by the Critics Choice Association

Diversity in Media Awards

Edinburgh International Television Festival 
A panel of journalists and television executives for the annual awards given out at the Edinburgh International Television Festival voted Doctor Who as the best programme of the year in 2007 and 2008.

Emmy Awards

Primetime Emmy Awards 
The Primetime Emmy Award is an American accolade bestowed by the Academy of Television Arts & Sciences in recognition of excellence in American primetime television programming since 1949.

Glamour Awards

Glenfiddich Spirit of Scotland Awards 
In 2007, David Tennant won a Glenfiddich Spirit of Scotland Award, in the Screen Award category.

Golden Nymphs 
The Monte-Carlo Television Festival reward every year various television series with its award, the "Golden Nymph".

Hugo Awards 
In every year of its broadcast since 2005, Doctor Who has received multiple nominations (each for a different episode) for the Short Form category of the Hugo Award for Best Dramatic Presentation, the oldest award for science fiction, winning every year until 2012 except 2009 for a total of six awards. The series receives a record of three separate nominations each in 2006, 2007, 2010, 2011, 2012 and 2013.

Several episodes of the 2005 series of Doctor Who were nominated for the Hugo Award for Best Dramatic Presentation, Short Form: "Dalek", "Father's Day" and the double episode "The Empty Child"/"The Doctor Dances". At a ceremony at the Worldcon (L.A. Con IV) in Los Angeles on 27 August 2006, the Hugo was awarded to "The Empty Child"/"The Doctor Dances". "Dalek" and "Father's Day" came in second and third places respectively.
The 2006 series episodes "School Reunion", "Army of Ghosts"/"Doomsday" and "The Girl in the Fireplace" were nominated for the same category of the 2007 Hugo Awards, with "The Girl in the Fireplace" winning.

The 2007 series episodes "Blink" and "Human Nature"/"The Family of Blood" also secured nominations in this category in the 2008 Hugo Awards, with "Blink" winning the award.
The 2008 series episodes "Silence in the Library"/"Forest of the Dead" and "Turn Left" secured nominations in this category in the 2009 Hugo awards, but lost to Dr. Horrible's Sing-Along Blog. The 2009 series episodes "The Waters of Mars", "The Next Doctor", and "Planet of the Dead" secured nominations in this category in the 2010 Hugo awards, with "The Waters of Mars" winning the award.
"Vincent and the Doctor", "The Pandorica Opens" / "The Big Bang", and "A Christmas Carol" from the 2010 series were also nominated in the Short Form category for the 2011 award, and was won by "The Pandorica Opens" / "The Big Bang". Notably, Doctor Who was the only ongoing series nominated in the 2011 competition, with the remainder of the nominees being one-off short films. "The Doctor's Wife" won the 2012 award.

For the 2014 ceremony, two Doctor Who episodes received nominations: "The Name of the Doctor" and "The Day of the Doctor". In 2015 episode "Listen" was nominated for the award.

IGN Best of Television Awards 
In 2011 Doctor Who was nominated by IGN for Best Sci-Fi/Horror Series. American Horror Story won the award.

National Television Awards 
The National Television Awards are the most prominent ceremony for which the results are voted on by the general public.

The revived series have been very popular: every year from 2005 to 2010, it won the Most Popular Drama Award and the actor who played The Doctor won the Best Actor Award (name variable, depending on the year), once for Eccleston and four for Tennant. Three actress who played the Doctor's main companion have been nominated: Piper won Best Actress in 2005 and 2006, Agyeman was nominated for Best Actress in 2007, and Tate was nominated for Outstanding Drama Performance in 2008 but lost due to Tennant's victory on the same category.

2011 was the first year without win for the revival series: it was nominated once again for Most Popular Drama, and Matt Smith was nominated for Most Popular Drama Performance. When the Most Popular Drama Performance Award was split the following year, Smith won Male and Karen Gillan won Female.

2019 saw the return of Doctor Who to the shortlisted nominations list of the National Television Awards for the first time since 2016 when it was nominated for Most Popular Drama Series. Both Jodie Whittaker and the series were nominated in the shortlist.

Nebula/Ray Bradbury Awards 
The Nebula Awards are presented by the Science Fiction and Fantasy Writers of America. Doctor Who received two nominations in the Best Script category, but lost it to Hayao Miyazaki's Howl's Moving Castle and Guillermo del Toro's Pan's Labyrinth respectively. In 2009 the award was replaced by the Bradbury Award in which Doctor Who was nominated in 2011 and won in 2012.

Nickelodeon Kid's Choice Awards
Every year, Nickelodeon screens an awards show where, as the name depicts, kids vote for their favourites in each category. Doctor Who was nominated in 2012 and 2013 in the Best UK Show category but lost to The X Factor and House of Anubis respectively.

Peabody Award
In 2013, BBC Wales was awarded an Institutional Peabody Award for Doctor Who. The award is granted for "excellence in its own terms" to television, radio and electronic media. The award's website praised Doctor Who as follows: "Seemingly immortal, 50-years-old and still running, this engaging, imaginative sci-fi/fantasy series is awarded an Institutional Peabody for evolving with technology and the times like nothing else in the known television universe."

People's Choice Awards 
In 2008 the show received a nomination for the People's Choice Awards, where results are voted online by general public. Doctor Who was nominated for Favorite Sci Fi/Fantasy Show in 2005 but lost in to Stargate Atlantis. The PCA nomination marked the first time a mainstream popular, non-niche American award had recognized the series.

PinkNews Awards

Rockie Awards 
The Rockie Awards are presented by the Banff World Media Festival, a Canadian event, ever since at least 2016.

RTS Television Awards 
The Royal Television Society's annual awards are decided by balanced juries of media professionals, with separate juries for individual categories within each of the six groups of Awards. The group of awards for which Doctor Who was nominated were the Television Awards.

In 1974, the RTS Television Awards gave to Doctor Who the first award in its history. Its only other victory was on 2008, 34 years later. The series was nominated three times for Best Drama Series, but never won.

Satellite Awards 
Satellite Awards are presented by the International Press Academy. David Tennant received a nomination in 2008, while the series and Jodie Whittaker were nominated for two categories in 2018.

Saturn Awards 
The Saturn Awards, annually presented Academy of Science Fiction, Fantasy & Horror Films since 1972, are the second oldest awards to honor science fiction, fantasy and horror (after the Hugo Awards). However it only began to reward series in 1989, after Doctor Who'''s original run. The series has been nominated for 20 awards between 2007 and 2019, winning the only Best International Series Award (defeating its spin-off Torchwood) in 2008 and Best Television Presentation for the Christmas special "The Husbands of River Song" in 2016.

The 1996 Doctor Who television movie won Best Television Presentation, one of the only four awards received by the franchise prior to its revival in 2005. McGann was nominated for Best Actor.

 Scream Awards 

The Scream Awards are dedicated to the horror, sci-fi, and fantasy genres of feature films and series. Winners are elected by fans among pre-selectioned nominees via online.

 Scribe Awards 

 Seoul International Drama Awards 

In 2009, the Seoul International Drama Award from South Korea honoured Doctor Who with the Award for Most Popular Foreign Drama of Year.

 SFX Awards 
At the SFX Awards, presented by the eponymous science fiction/fantasy magazine,  Doctor Who won every category it was nominated for from 2005 to 2008 included. Currently, every actor nominated for an award won it (except Tennant, who lost Best Actor to Smith in 2011). The series won four times Best TV Show, three Best TV Episode (with eight nominations overall), five Best Actor and four Best Actress. It receives a triple nomination for Best TV Episode in 2007, a double nomination in the same category in 2010, and a double nomination for Best TV Actor in 2011. The 2012 shortlist includes Best TV Show, Best TV Actor for Smith, and Best TV Actress for Karen Gillan, Alex Kingston and Suranne Jones.

In 2005, the series came first in a survey by SFX magazine of "The Greatest UK Science Fiction and Fantasy Television Series Ever".

 Sunday Herald Culture Awards 

 TV Quick Awards 
The TV Quick Awards (or TV Choice Awards) are awarded every year by the British magazine TV Choice.Doctor Who won Best Loved Drama, later changed to Best Family Drama, every time since 2005. The actor who played the Doctor and the actress who played his main companion during a series was nominated every year since 2005: Best Actor had been won one time by Eccleston and three times by Tennant, and Best Actress had been won once by Piper, once by Tate and once by Gillan.

 TV Times Awards 

TRIC Awards
The TRIC Awards are annually presented by the Television and Radio Industries Club.

VES Awards
At the Visual Effects Society Awards, Doctor Who'' won one award out of six.

Visionary Arts Organisation Award 

The episode Rosa won the Visionary Arts Organisation Award for Television Show of the Year at the BAFTA in London.

Writers' Guild of Great Britain 
Every year the Writers' Guild of Great Britain honours the best writing. The series have been nominated five time: one in 1975, and four times for the revived series. Steven Moffat have been nominated three times overall, winning one.

References

awards
Doctor Who